Honour – Valour – Pride is the seventh album by the British death metal band Bolt Thrower. It was recorded and mixed at Sable Rose Studios in Coventry, England, June to September 2001. It was produced by the band and Andy Faulkner, and was released on Metal Blade Records in 2001. Honour – Valour – Pride is the only full length Bolt Thrower album not featuring Karl Willetts and the first with Martin Kearns on drums.

Track listing
All songs written by Bolt Thrower

Personnel
Bolt Thrower
 Dave Ingram – vocals
 Gavin Ward – guitars
 Barry Thomson – guitars
 Martin Kearns – drums
 Jo Bench – bass guitar

Production
 Axel Jusseit – live photography
 Andy Faulkner – producer
 Jan Meininghaus – artwork, layout

References

2001 albums
Bolt Thrower albums
Metal Blade Records albums